Redmon may refer to:

Places:
 Redmon, Illinois, a United States village

People:
 Anthony Redmon
 Dusty Redmon
 Ginger Redmon
 Jessie Redmon Fauset
 Redmon & Vale

Other:
 RedMon (software), a printer port redirecter for Windows

See also
 Redmond (disambiguation)
 Redman (disambiguation)